Ben Wilson (born 9 August 1992) is an English footballer who plays for Coventry City as a goalkeeper.

Career

Early career
Wilson began his career with Sunderland in 2006, earning a professional contract in 2010. He was sent on loan to Harrogate Town in 2013, playing three times.

Wilson was sent out on loan to Gateshead and Chesterfield, failing to make an appearance for either and was released by Sunderland in the summer of 2013.

After leaving Sunderland, Wilson joined Cambridge United on a non-contract basis on 9 August 2013. He joined Accrington Stanley on 27 August 2013, and made his professional debut on 3 September 2013 in a 1–0 defeat against Crewe Alexandra in the Football League Trophy.

Wilson left Stanley after a single Football League Trophy appearance for the side in November 2013; his contract was terminated by mutual consent.

Cardiff City
He joined Cardiff City in the same month. On 7 July 2014, Wilson played 10 minutes as a midfielder, against Carmarthen Town in a friendly. Wilson has featured on the bench several times during the 2014–2015 season as well as making a number of under-21 appearances. The following season, Wilson signed a new contract, keeping him in South Wales until 2017. He made his Cardiff debut against AFC Wimbledon on 11 August 2015, in the League Cup.

Two months later, Wilson joined AFC Wimbledon on an emergency one-month loan deal. Wilson was signed as a short-term replacement for the injured first choice keeper James Shea. He made his Wimbledon debut on the same day he was signed in a 3–4 League Two away win against Accrington Stanley. However, having let in a goal from a speculative long free-kick taken by Jerome Okimo from inside his own half during a 2–1 defeat to Stevenage, Wilson became embroiled in a social media row with Wimbledon supporters after they criticised his performance on the website Twitter. Wilson responded to some messages of criticism by posting "you're still paying to watch me every week and helping towards my wage, I'm laughing and you're losing out". As a result, his loan spell was terminated early by Wimbledon on 14 December 2015.

His league debut for Cardiff City came on 27 August 2016, where he played in a 1–0 loss to Reading, after signing a two-year contract extension. Having not made an appearance for Cardiff since September 2016, Wilson then joined League One side Rochdale on loan for the remainder of the 2016–17 season.

At the start of the following season, Wilson joined Oldham Athletic on loan until 1 January 2018. On 31 January 2018, he was then loaned to non-league Telford United, making 17 league appearances.

Bradford City

Wilson signed for Bradford City in July 2018.

In May 2019, following Bradford City's relegation to League Two, it was announced that he would leave the club upon the expiry of his contract on 30 June 2019. He was one of eleven players to be released.

Coventry City

In May 2019, he agreed a three-year deal with Coventry City, which began in July 2019. He spent the 2019–20 season acting as back-up to first-choice goalkeeper Marko Marosi, and was limited to playing in cup competitions.

He began the 2020–21 season in the same role, but made his league debut for the club as a late substitute in a 1-0 win at Cardiff, due to an injury to Marosi. Subsequently, in Marosi's absence, he went on to start Coventry's next five matches. 

Wilson ended the 2020-21 season as The Sky Blues’ first choice keeper. However following the arrival of Simon Moore ahead of the 2021-22 season, Wilson reverted to the role of substitute keeper as the club mounted a Play-Off push over the course of the campaign. Wilson did however play the final three matches of the season and in the first of which he saved a last minute penalty to ensure a point and a 0-0 draw in an away match with West Bromwich Albion 

On 20 January 2023, Wilson signed a new two and a half year contract keeping him at the club until 2025.

Career statistics

References

External links

1992 births
Living people
English footballers
Association football goalkeepers
English Football League players
National League (English football) players
Sunderland A.F.C. players
Harrogate Town A.F.C. players
Gateshead F.C. players
Chesterfield F.C. players
Cambridge United F.C. players
Accrington Stanley F.C. players
Cardiff City F.C. players
AFC Wimbledon players
Rochdale A.F.C. players
Oldham Athletic A.F.C. players
AFC Telford United players
Bradford City A.F.C. players
Coventry City F.C. players